Pamela Lee may refer to:

 Pamela Anderson (born 1967), a Canadian-American actress and model
 Pamela M. Lee, art historian